Steven Albert Kiner (born  June 12, 1947) is a former American football linebacker in the National Football League for the Dallas Cowboys, New England Patriots, and Houston Oilers. He played college football the University of Tennessee, where he was an All-American. He was inducted into the College Football Hall of Fame.

Early years

Kiner's family lived in different Army bases, including Germany, Georgia and Switzerland. He attended Hillsborough High School in Tampa, Florida, where he was all-city and all-state on both offense (quarterback) and defense (strong safety). His football coach called him Killer Kiner. He also practiced basketball and Track.

College career
He originally accepted a football scholarship from the  University of Florida, but after it was revoked, he decided to play for the University of Tennessee. He was converted into a linebacker and became a three-year starter. He played in the same linebacking unit as future NFL player Jack "Hacksaw" Reynolds and was named SEC Sophomore of the Year.

In 1968, he posted 12 tackles and 2 interceptions while playing against the University of Mississippi with a broken wrist. His talent made Bear Bryant state, "the best in this league since Lee Roy Jordan played for us". In 1969, he was awarded the SEC Defensive Player of the Year award. He also was a two-time All-SEC and All-American selection.

In 1999, he was inducted into the College Football Hall of Fame, the University of Tennessee Athletics Hall of Fame and to the SEC Football Legends. In 1998, he was inducted into the Tennessee Sports Hall of Fame. In 1990, he was named to the "100 Years of Volunteers" All-time team.

Professional career

Dallas Cowboys
Kiner was selected by the Dallas Cowboys in the third round (73rd overall) of the 1970 NFL Draft. He roomed with Duane Thomas in training camp, and was recognized for his special teams play as a rookie, including Super Bowl V.

In 1971, he clashed with Tom Landry, after Chuck Howley was convinced to come back from retirement and gave him the position Kiner thought he deserved, forcing the team to trade him to the New England Patriots in exchange for a fourth round draft choice (#90-Robert West) on July 23.

New England Patriots (first stint)
With the New England Patriots he lasted just one season, where he became a starter and had 4 interceptions. In 1972, he was expelled from training camp by head coach John Mazur and traded to the Miami Dolphins in exchange for defensive lineman Bill Griffin on August 4.

Miami Dolphins
The Miami Dolphins waived Kiner before training camp ended on August 30, 1972.

Washington Redskins
On September 2, 1972, the Washington Redskins claimed him for their taxi squad. He was released on September 11, 1973.

New England Patriots (second stint)
On September 12, 1973, he was claimed by the New England Patriots and played one season. On January 30, 1974, he was traded to the Houston Oilers in exchange for a ninth round draft choice (#209-Ed McCartney).

Houston Oilers
Kiner turned his career around with the Houston Oilers playing in a 3-4 defense. He had five productive seasons and was credited by head coach Bum Phillips "for turning the Houston Oilers into winners". He was waived before the start of the season on August 27, 1979.

Personal life
After football he earned two master's degrees and got involved in health care, managing emergency psychiatric services for Emory Healthcare at the Emory University School of Medicine in Atlanta, Georgia. His father survived four years a prisoner of during World War II in Japan.

References

External links
 Tennessee Sports Hall of Fame bio
 Kiner Sheds Tag; New Start in Houston
 The curious case of former Cowboy Steve Kiner and his missing Cotton Bowl watch

1947 births
Living people
Players of American football from Tampa, Florida
American football linebackers
All-American college football players
College Football Hall of Fame inductees
Dallas Cowboys players
Houston Oilers players
New England Patriots players
Tennessee Volunteers football players